The Palace of Culture and Science (abbreviated PKiN) is a notable high-rise building in central Warsaw, Poland. With a total height of  it is the second tallest building in both Warsaw and Poland after Varso, the 6th-tallest building in the European Union (including spire) and one of the tallest on the European continent. Constructed in 1955, it houses various public and cultural institutions such as cinemas, theatres, libraries, sports clubs, university faculties, and authorities of the Polish Academy of Sciences. Since 2007, it has been enlisted in the Registry of Objects of Cultural Heritage.

Motivated by Polish historical architecture and American art deco high-rise buildings, the PKiN was designed by Soviet-Russian architect Lev Rudnev in "Seven Sisters" style and is informally referred to as the Eighth Sister. The Palace was also the tallest clock tower in the world until the installation of a clock mechanism on the NTT Docomo Yoyogi Building in Tokyo, Japan.

History

Name

The building was originally known as the Joseph Stalin's Palace of Culture and Science (Pałac Kultury i Nauki imienia Józefa Stalina), but in the wake of destalinization the dedication to Stalin was revoked. Stalin's name was removed from the colonnade, interior lobby and one of the building's sculptures.

Construction

Construction started in 1952 and lasted until 1955 during the Soviet occupation of Poland as an imposed and unwanted "gift" to the people of Poland. As one commentator describes it, the Palace "was a "gift of the Soviet peoples to People's Poland" that Warsaw could not refuse. It was erected with great propagandistic fanfare and named after Joseph Stalin upon its completion in 1955."

The tower was constructed, using Soviet plans, by 3,500 to 5,000 Soviet workers and 4,000 Polish workers. Sixteen workers died in accidents during the construction. The builders were housed at a new suburban complex built at Poland's expense, with its own cinema, food court, community centre and swimming pool, called Osiedle "Przyjaźni" (Neighborhood of Friendship). 

The architecture of the building is closely related to several similar skyscrapers built in the Soviet Union of the same era, most notably the Main building of Moscow State University, the House of the Free Press in Bucharest, Romania and the Latvian Academy of Sciences building in Riga, Latvia, which was also imposed on Latvia while it was occupied by the Soviets. However, the main architect Lev Rudnev incorporated some Polish architectural details into the project after travelling around Poland and seeing the architecture. The monumental walls are headed with pieces of masonry copied from Renaissance houses and palaces of Kraków and Zamość.

Shortly after opening, the building hosted the 5th World Festival of Youth and Students. Many visiting dignitaries toured the Palace, and it also hosted performances by notable international artists, such as a 1967 concert by The Rolling Stones, the first by a major western rock group behind the Iron Curtain. In 1985, it hosted the historic Leonard Cohen concert, surrounded by many political expectations, which were avoided by Cohen in his prolonged introductions during the three-hour show.

Four  clock faces were added to the top of the building ahead of the millennium celebrations in 2000. The clocks began working on 31 December 2000.

Present day

The building currently serves as an exhibition centre and office complex. The Palace contains a multiplex cinema with eight screens (Kinoteka), four theatres (Studio, Dramatyczny, Lalka and 6. piętro), two museums (Museum of Evolution and Museum of Technology), offices, bookshops, a large swimming pool, an auditorium hall for 3,000 people called Congress Hall, and an accredited university, Collegium Civitas, on the 11th and 12th floors of the building.

The Congress Hall held the finals of Miss World 2006.

In 2010, the illumination of the building was modernized and high-power LED lights were installed, allowing the Palace to take various colours at night. The first use of the new lighting was during Christmas in 2010, when the Palace was illuminated in green and white to resemble a Christmas tree. In December 2013, during the Euromaidan protests, it was illuminated in blue and yellow, the colours of the Ukrainian national flag as a sign of solidarity with the protesters. On 29 January 2021, during the Women's Strike protests, the symbol of the movement – a single red bolt on a black background – was projected on the building.

Controversy
The Palace of Culture and Science is highly controversial. It is often viewed as a reminder of Soviet influence over the Polish People's Republic, especially due to its construction during mass violations of human rights under Joseph Stalin. Porozumienie Organizacji Kombatanckich i Niepodległościowych w Krakowie, a coalition of veteran and nationalist groups, as well as Law and Justice (PiS) have called for its demolition. In 2009, then Foreign Minister Radosław Sikorski supported the demolition of the Palace noting the expense involved in its maintenance. Other prominent government leaders have continued to endorse demolition plans, including current Prime Minister Mateusz Morawiecki.

See also
 List of tallest buildings in Poland
 List of tallest buildings in Warsaw
 Eighth Sister
 Latvian Academy of Sciences in Riga
 Lighthouse of Alexandria
 House of the Free Press in Bucharest
 Museum of Communism, Warsaw
 Neoclassical architecture
 Oakland City Hall
 Parade Square (Plac Defilad)
 Socialist realism in Poland

References

Further reading
Michał Murawski (2019), The Palace Complex: A Stalinist Skyscraper, Capitalist Warsaw, and a City Transfixed, Indiana University Press,

External links

Official site

Skyscrapers of Warsaw – Palace of Culture and Science
Google maps view on Palace of Culture and Science

Śródmieście, Warsaw
Clock towers
Landmarks in Poland
Palaces in Warsaw
Poland–Soviet Union relations
Office buildings completed in 1955
Towers completed in 1955
1955 establishments in Poland
Socialist realism
Stalinism in Poland
Stalinist architecture
Art Deco architecture in Poland
Soviet foreign aid
Skyscraper office buildings in Warsaw